Burow's solution is an aqueous solution of aluminium triacetate. It is available in the U.S. as an over-the-counter drug for topical administration, with brand names including Domeboro (Moberg Pharma), Domeboro Otic (ear drops), Star-Otic, and Borofair.
The preparation has astringent and antibacterial properties and may be used to treat a number of skin conditions, including insect bites and stings, rashes caused by poison ivy and poison sumac, swelling, allergies, and bruises. However, its main use is for treatment of otitis (ear infection), including otomycosis (fungal ear infection).

History
The creator of Burow's solution was Karl August Burow (1809-1874), a military surgeon and anatomist. Burow was also the inventor of some plastic surgery and wound healing techniques which are still in wide use today.

Use

Otitis
Burow's solution may be used to treat various forms of ear infections, known as otitis. As a drug it is inexpensive and non-ototoxic. In cases of otomycosis it is less effective than clotrimazole but remains an effective treatment.

Skin irritation
Most versions of Burow's solution can be used as a soak or compress. As an FDA approved astringent it is used for the relief of skin irritations due to poison ivy, oak and sumac, and rashes from allergic reactions to soaps, detergents, cosmetics and jewelry. This is due to the combination of two active ingredients found in this version of Burow's solution, i.e. aluminum sulfate tetradecahydrate and calcium acetate monohydrate.

The solution is used by some to reduce inflammation and potential infection from conditions such as ingrown nails, in a warm water soak.

See also
 Urushiol
 Urushiol-induced contact dermatitis
 Anti-itch drug

References 

Antipruritics
Dermatologic drugs